The Modesto Bee is a California newspaper, founded in 1884 as the Daily Evening News and published continuously as a daily under a variety of names. Before its purchase by Charles K. McClatchy and McClatchy Newspapers in 1924, it merged in the same year with the Modesto News-Herald, adopting that name as part of a consolidation. In 1933 it changed its name to the Modesto Bee and News-Herald, and in 1975 abbreviated the name on its masthead to The Modesto Bee. Its current owner is the descendant firm, McClatchy Company, an American newspaper corporation.

The Modesto Bee has about 70 employees and is delivered throughout central California, reaching places such as Modesto, Turlock, Oakdale, Ceres, Patterson and Sonora. It currently serves 29,729 morning subscribers and 37,616 on Sundays.

See also

References

External links 
 
 The Modesto Bee official mobile website
 The Modesto Bee RSS feeds
 The McClatchy Company's subsidiary profile of The Modesto Bee

1884 establishments in California
Companies that have filed for bankruptcy in the United States
Culture of Modesto, California
Daily newspapers published in California
Mass media in Stanislaus County, California
McClatchy publications
Modesto, California
Publications established in 1884